Jabal Zambar is a large hill in the Tel Afar District of Nineveh Province of northern Iraq.
The name may also be rendered as Jabal or Jebel Sinbar, Zinbar or Zinbār, or Zambar Mountain.

Geography

Jebel Zambar is in a transitional folded zone between the alpinotype area to the northeast and the Arabian Shield to the southwest.
This area holds the major anticlinal structures between the Tigris and the Al-Tharthar basin.
The zone includes Jebel Sinjar, Jebel Sinu, Jebel Sasan, Jebel Zambar, Jebel Sheik Ibrahim and Jebel Adaiya.
The Jebels Zambar and Ibrahim are sometimes treated as one structure.

The Sanjar-Zambar mountain range includes the Teymurlenk (Tamerlane) hills, which contain the Turkmen city of Tal Afar.
Jabal Zambar is the highest point in the hilly area to the east of Tal Afar.

History

In the late 1930s Germans drilled wells on the Zambar and Qusair structures west of Mosul towards Sinjar.
A feasibility study of the Mosul Dam project was to include a study of irrigating the northern catchment area of the Tharthar depression. 
This would include construction of a water supply tunnel under Jabal Zambar.
On 7 January 2006 twelve U.S, military personnel died when their UH-60 Blackhawk helicopter crashed on Zambar Mountain.

References
Citations

Sources

Mountains of Iraq
Nineveh Governorate